Gahvareh Poshteh (also Romanized as Gahvāreh Poshteh) is a village in Chehel Shahid Rural District, in the Central District of Ramsar County, Mazandaran Province, Iran. At the 2006 census, its population was 21, in 6 families.

References 

Populated places in Ramsar County